When Love Was Blind is a 1917 American silent drama film directed by Frederick Sullivan and starring Florence La Badie, Thomas A. Curran and Boyd Marshall. It was shot at studios in Jacksonville, Florida.

Cast

References

Bibliography
 Blair Miller. Almost Hollywood: The Forgotten Story of Jacksonville, Florida. Hamilton Books, 2013.

External links
 

1917 films
1917 drama films
1910s English-language films
American silent feature films
Silent American drama films
American black-and-white films
Films directed by Frederic Richard Sullivan
Pathé Exchange films
1910s American films